Jon C. Olsen (born April 25, 1969) is an American former competition swimmer, four-time Olympic champion, and former world record-holder. Olsen was a successful relay swimmer for the U.S. national team in the late 1980s and 1990s. He has won a total of 27 medals in major international competition, 20 gold, 5 silver, and 2 bronze spanning the Olympics, the World, Pan Pacific, and the Pan American championships.

Swimming career

Olsen represented the United States at two consecutive Olympic Games, and won a total number of five Olympic medals, including four golds.  At the 1992 Summer Olympics in Barcelona, Spain, he won his first gold medal as a member of the winning U.S. team in the men's 4×100-meter freestyle relay, together with teammates Joe Hudepohl, Matt Biondi and Tom Jager.  He won a second gold medal for swimming the freestyle anchor leg for the first-place U.S. team in the men's 4×100-meter medley relay. With his medley relay teammates Jeff Rouse (backstroke), Nelson Diebel (breaststroke), and Pablo Morales (butterfly), he tied the world record in the event of 3:36.93. He also received a bronze medal as a member of the third-place U.S. team in the men's 4×200-meter freestyle relay.  Individually, he also placed fourth in the final of the men's 100-meter freestyle with a time of 49.51 seconds.

Four years later at the 1996 Summer Olympics in Atlanta, Georgia, Olsen again won a gold medal as a member of the first-place U.S. team in the men's 4×100-meter freestyle relay with fellow team members Josh Davis, Brad Schumacher and Gary Hall, Jr., and set a new Olympic record of 3:15.41. He received another gold for swimming for the winning U.S. team in the preliminary heats of the men's 4×200-meter freestyle relay.  He also competed in the individual men's 100-meter freestyle and placed ninth overall in the B Final of the event with a time of 49.80 seconds. Olsen was elected captain of the U.S. Olympic swim team at the 1996 Games by his teammates.

During his career, Olsen was trained by former freestyle sprinter Jonty Skinner.  He was also coached by the current Laurel Swim Association head coach, Warren Holladay, who was previously an assistant coach at the University of Alabama.  Olsen attended the University of Alabama, where he swam for Alabama Crimson Tide swimming and diving team.  He currently resides in the Florida Keys with his family where he coaches swimming.  He has two daughters and a son.

See also
 List of multiple Olympic gold medalists
 List of Olympic medalists in swimming (men)
 List of University of Alabama people
 List of World Aquatics Championships medalists in swimming (men)
 World record progression 4 × 100 metres freestyle relay
 World record progression 4 × 100 metres medley relay

References

1969 births
Living people
Alabama Crimson Tide men's swimmers
American male freestyle swimmers
World record setters in swimming
Medalists at the FINA World Swimming Championships (25 m)
Olympic bronze medalists for the United States in swimming
Olympic gold medalists for the United States in swimming
Sportspeople from New Britain, Connecticut
Swimmers at the 1992 Summer Olympics
Swimmers at the 1995 Pan American Games
Swimmers at the 1996 Summer Olympics
World Aquatics Championships medalists in swimming
Medalists at the 1996 Summer Olympics
Medalists at the 1992 Summer Olympics
Pan American Games gold medalists for the United States
Pan American Games medalists in swimming
Medalists at the 1995 Pan American Games
American people of Danish descent